is a Japanese female sport shooter. At the 2004 Summer Olympics, she competed in the women's 25 metre pistol.  At the 2012 Summer Olympics, she competed in the Women's 10 metre air pistol and the Women's 25 metre pistol.

References

External links
 

1979 births
Living people
Sportspeople from Hokkaido
Japan Ground Self-Defense Force personnel
Japanese female sport shooters
Olympic shooters of Japan
Shooters at the 2004 Summer Olympics
Shooters at the 2012 Summer Olympics
Asian Games medalists in shooting
Shooters at the 2002 Asian Games
Shooters at the 2006 Asian Games
Shooters at the 2010 Asian Games
Shooters at the 2014 Asian Games
Asian Games silver medalists for Japan
Medalists at the 2002 Asian Games
Medalists at the 2006 Asian Games
Medalists at the 2010 Asian Games
Shooters at the 2018 Asian Games
Yakumo, Hokkaido